Ruoqiang Loulan Airport  is an airport serving Ruoqiang County in Bayingolin Mongol Autonomous Prefecture, Xinjiang, China. It received approval from the State Council of China and the Central Military Commission in March 2014. The airport is located in Xitatirang Village, west of the county seat Ruoqiang Town. Construction began in November 2015, with an investment of 546 million yuan. The airport was opened on 29 March 2018, and became the 20th airport in Xinjiang.

Facilities
It is projected to handle 120,000 passengers and 480 tons of cargo annually by 2020.

Airlines and destinations

See also
List of airports in China
List of the busiest airports in China

References

Airports in Xinjiang
Airports established in 2018
2018 establishments in China
Bayingolin Mongol Autonomous Prefecture